Franck Lapersonne (a.k.a. Franck de la Personne) (born 29 October 1963) is a French comedian, actor theatre director, and political candidate.

Personal life
Franck de la Personne is the son of Jacques Lapersonne and Jacqueline Charlotte Poinson. He also has brothers and sisters. He graduated from the Conservatoire de Paris.

As of February 2017, he openly supports Marine Le Pen in the French presidential election. He is also running in the 2017 French legislative election to represent the Somme for the National Front.He is now a vice president of the party "Les Patriotes" founded by Florian Philippot, the former right-hand man of Marine Le Pen.

Theater

Filmography

References

External links

 

1963 births
Living people
Conservatoire de Paris alumni
20th-century French male actors
21st-century French male actors
French male film actors
French male television actors
French male stage actors
French theatre directors
National Rally (France) politicians